A T-square is a drafting and technical drawing tool.

T-square may also refer to:

T-square (fractal), in mathematics, a two-dimensional fractal
T-Square (software), an early drafting software program
T-Square (band), a Japanese jazz fusion band
A variation of grand cross in astrology
T-square position, a sexual position
Tsquared (born 1987), professional Halo player

See also
 TT (disambiguation)
 2T (disambiguation)
 T2 (disambiguation)
 Square (disambiguation)
 The Square (disambiguation)